Mary Nolan (born 1954) is a Democratic politician from the U.S. state of Oregon. They represented District 36 (formerly District 11) in the Oregon House of Representatives from 2001 to 2013, and served as the majority leader from 2008 to 2010. They ran unsuccessfully for the Portland City Council in 2012.

Personal life and education
Mary Nolan was born in Chicago, Illinois. They are married to Mark Gardiner; they have one daughter.

Nolan was in the first class of women admitted into Dartmouth College, from which they graduated magna cum laude in mathematics.

Following their departure from elected politics, Nolan was a finalist for a position with Planned Parenthood, and was then hired in 2013 as a vice president at FamilyCare, a Medicare and Medicaid managed-care provider in Portland.

Political career
Nolan was first elected to the Oregon House of Representatives in 2000. Upon winning their second term in 2002, they were named the assistant Democratic leadership. Before the 2009 legislative session, Dave Hunt, the then-majority leader, was elected speaker of the Oregon House of Representatives. The Democratic Caucus then elected Nolan as the new majority leader. They were the House Majority Leader in the Oregon House of Representatives from November 2008 until November 2010. In November 2010, the House Democratic Caucus did not re-elect Nolan to any leadership position.

According to The Oregonian, as of 2010 Nolan voted with Democrats 96.77% of the time, and had a 1.08% absence record. After Nolan voted "no" on House Bill 2001, which would have increased transportation taxes by $300 million a year in 2009, The Oregonian reported that the move could mean that Nolan may have been planning to run for another public office like Mayor of Portland or City Council because of what it meant for environmentalists who had opposed the transportation bill.

Nolan ran for a seat on the Portland City Council in May 2012, challenging incumbent commissioner Amanda Fritz. Fritz won the runoff election in November 2012.

In 2020, Mary Nolan ran and won the election for Portland, OR Metro Council, District 5. They advanced from the primary on May 19, 2020, and faced Chris Smith in the general election. Nolan won with 61% of the vote to Smith's 37%. District 5 covers much of North Portland, Oregon.

Committee assignments
2009 Regular Session
Conference Committee On HB 2227, Chair
Land Use Committee, Chair
Legislative Administration Committee
Rules Committee
Session Schedule Committee

Issues

Firearms
On March 14, 2003, Nolan introduced a bill that would make it a crime to possess a gun while on a public bus.

Electoral history
Oregon House of Representatives, 11th district, 2000
 Mary Nolan (D) – 18,008
 Joan Gardner (R) – 7,752

Oregon House of Representatives, 36th district, 2002
 Mary Nolan (D) – 16,092

Oregon House of Representatives, 36th district, 2004
 Mary Nolan (D) – 25,876
 Joe H. Tabor (L) – 3,684

Oregon House of Representatives, 36th district, 2006
 Mary Nolan (D) – 20,344
 Frank Dane (L) – 3,520

Oregon House of Representatives, 36th district, 2008
 Endorsed by Willamette Week

Other activities
Nolan is the chair of the NASA industry advisory council. In the 2010 election for governor of Oregon, Nolan endorsed John Kitzhaber, the Democratic former Governor of Oregon. The Kitzhaber campaign released this statement:

References

External links
Oregon State House – Mary Nolan official government website
Project Vote Smart – Representative Mary Nolan (OR) profile
Portland Community College interview with Mary Nolan
Follow the Money – Mary Nolan
2006 2004 2002 2000 campaign contributions

1954 births
Living people
Democratic Party members of the Oregon House of Representatives
Women state legislators in Oregon
Politicians from Chicago
Dartmouth College alumni
21st-century American politicians
21st-century American women politicians
Metro councilors (Oregon regional government)